Philometroides is a genus of nematodes belonging to the family Philometridae.

The species of this genus are found in Europe and Northern America.

Species:

Philometroides acreanensis 
Philometroides atropi 
Philometroides barbi 
Philometroides branchiarum 
Philometroides branchiostegi 
Philometroides cyprini 
Philometroides denticulatus 
Philometroides dogieli 
Philometroides eleutheronemae 
Philometroides grandipapillatus 
Philometroides huronensis 
Philometroides indonesiensis 
Philometroides maplestoni 
Philometroides moraveci 
Philometroides nodulosus 
Philometroides oveni 
Philometroides paralichthydis 
Philometroides seriolae 
Philometroides stomachicus 
Philometroides tahieli 
Philometroides trichiuri

References

Nematodes